Ayman Mahmoud (born 1 March 1967) is an Egyptian modern pentathlete. He competed at the 1988 Summer Olympics.

References

External links
 

1967 births
Living people
Egyptian male modern pentathletes
Olympic modern pentathletes of Egypt
Modern pentathletes at the 1988 Summer Olympics